This is a list of schools in North East Lincolnshire, England.

State-funded schools

Primary schools

Bursar Primary Academy, Cleethorpes
The Canon Peter Hall CE Primary School, Immingham
Coomb Briggs Primary Academy, Immingham
East Ravendale CE Primary Academy, Grimsby
Eastfield Primary Academy, Immingham
Edward Heneage Primary Academy, Grimsby
Elliston Primary Academy, Cleethorpes
Enfield Academy of New Waltham, New Waltham
Fairfield Academy, Scartho
Grange Primary School, Grimsby
Great Coates Primary School, Grimsby
Healing Primary Academy, Healing
The Humberston CE Primary School, Humberston
Humberston Cloverfields Academy, Humberston
Laceby Acres Primary Academy, Grimsby
Lisle Marsden CE Primary Academy, Grimsby
Littlecoates Primary Academy, Grimsby
Macaulay Primary Academy, Grimsby
Middlethorpe Primary Academy, Cleethorpes
New Waltham Academy, New Waltham
Oasis Academy Nunsthorpe, Grimsby
Old Clee Primary Academy, Grimsby
Ormiston South Parade Academy, Grimsby
Pilgrim Academy, Grimsby
Queen Mary Avenue Infants School, Cleethorpes
Reynolds Primary Academy, Cleethorpes
St Joseph's RC Primary Academy, Cleethorpes
St Mary's RC Academy, Grimsby
St Peter's CE Primary School, Cleethorpes
Scartho Infants' School and Nursery, Scartho
Scartho Junior Academy, Scartho
Signhills Academy, Grimsby
Signhills Infant Academy, Grimsby
Springfield Primary Academy, Grimsby
Stallingborough CE Primary School, Stallingborough
Stanford Junior and Infant School, Laceby
Strand Primary Academy, Grimsby
Thrunscoe Primary and Nursery Academy, Cleethorpes
Waltham Leas Primary Academy, Waltham
Weelsby Academy, Grimsby
Welholme Academy, Grimsby
Western Primary School, Grimsby
William Barcroft Junior School, Cleethorpes
Willows Academy, Grimsby
Woodlands Academy, Grimsby
Wybers Wood Academy, Grimsby
Yarborough Academy, Grimsby

Secondary schools

 Beacon Academy, Cleethorpes
 Cleethorpes Academy, Cleethorpes
 Havelock Academy, Grimsby
 Healing School, Healing
 Humberston Academy, Humberston
 John Whitgift Academy, Grimsby
 Oasis Academy Immingham, Immingham
 Oasis Academy Wintringham, Grimsby
 Ormiston Maritime Academy, Grimsby
 Tollbar Academy, New Waltham

Special and alternative schools
 Cambridge Park Academy, Grimsby
 Humberston Park School, Humberston
 Phoenix Park Academy, Grimsby
 Sevenhills Academy, Grimsby

Further education
 Franklin College, Grimsby
 Grimsby Institute of Further & Higher Education
 Linkage College

Independent schools

Primary and preparatory schools
St Martin's Preparatory School, Grimsby

Senior and all-through schools
St James School, Grimsby

Special and alternative schools
Best Futures, Aylesby
Learning4Life-GY, Grimsby
The Orchard Independent Special School, Grimsby

North East Lincolnshire
Schools in the Borough of North East Lincolnshire